Air Batumi was an airline based in Batumi, Georgia with its base at Batumi International Airport.

Destinations
Air Batumi used to serve the following destinations:

 Georgia
 Batumi - Batumi International Airport
 Tbilisi - Tbilisi International Airport
 Iran
 Tehran - Imam Khomeini International Airport

Fleet
The Air Batumi fleet included the following aircraft:

References

 https://web.archive.org/web/20101219073924/https://www.faa.gov/air_traffic/publications/atpubs/CNT/3-1-A.htm

External links
 

Defunct airlines of Georgia (country)
Batumi
Airlines established in 2010
Airlines disestablished in 2012
2010 establishments in Georgia (country)
2012 disestablishments in Georgia (country)